The Haute école de musique de Lausanne (HEMU, known as Institute of Advanced Musical Studies prior to 2010, founded in 1861 as Conservatoire de Lausanne) is a Swiss music school located in Romandy, the French-speaking western part of Switzerland.  It is a constituent institution of the University of Applied Sciences Western Switzerland.

History 
 Name change in 2010
Until the summer of 2010, the name, "Conservatoire de Lausanne", referred to two schools with different objectives and faculties. The Music School was public institution for educating children and young adults. The Institute of Advanced Musical Studies, based in Lausanne, Sion, and Fribourg, offered a comprehensive higher education for aspiring professional musicians. To mitigate the ensuing confusion, administrators in 2010 launched two new distinct identities. The School of Music became the Lausanne Conservatory and the Lausanne Institute of Advanced Musical Studies adopted the acronym HEMU for Haute école de musique. On 1 September 2008 the classical music schools of Sion and Fribourg integrated with HEMU.

 Founding in 1861
The Haute école de musique de Lausanne was founded in 1861 as the Conservatoire de Lausanne with a mandate of training and educating aspiring professional musicians. HEMU is a comprehensive music school that offers degrees leading to accredited bachelor's and master's degrees. HEMU has a cooperative affiliation with the University of Applied Sciences Western Switzerland.

 College divisions
HEMU currently has two divisions: Classical and Jazz. In 2013, approximately 300 students were enrolled in Classical and 60 in Jazz. According to the HEMU website, its jazz department is the only one of its kind in French-speaking Switzerland. Jazz at HEMU was launched in 2006.

 Library
HEMU has a large music library of scores, literature, references, and recordings.

 Pre-college division
Lausanne Conservatory for children and young adults has, as of 2012, an enrollment of about 1,200 students.

 Theater school
In 1909, the institution launched an acting school — Section professionnelle d'art dramatique du Conservatoire de Lausanne (SPAD). As of 2003, the acting school has been located in the Haute École de théâtre ("High School of Theater" or "HESTR") in Romandy.

Accreditation 
The HEMU bachelor's and master's degrees are accredited by the Swiss government and the Music and Performing Arts division of the University of Applied Sciences Western Switzerland (HES-SO), Switzerland's largest institution of constituent schools and colleges involved in research, higher education, and professional training. HEMU is a member of the European Association of Conservatoires.

Notable faculty and alumni

HEMU directors
 1861–1905: Gustavus Adolphus Koella
 1905–1908: Émile-Robert Blanchet (1877–1943), pianist
 1908–1921: Jules Nicati (1873–1939)
 1921–1941: Charles Troyon (1867–1948)
 1941–1957: Alfred Pochon (fr) (1878–1959), violinist and musicologist
 1957–1967: Carlo Hemmerling (de) (1903–1967)
 1967–1968: Edmond Defrancesco (interim)
 1968–1972: Rainer Bösch (born 1938), composer
 1972–1983: Michel Rochat
 1984–1998: Jean-Jacques Rapin (de) (1932-2015)
 1998–2001: Olivier Cuendet
 2001–2010: Pierre Wavre
 Since 2010: Hervé Klopfenstein (fr) (1957-), conductor, theory, flutist †

HEMU faculty
 Roger Bobo (born 1938), low-brass virtuoso
 1947–1960: Hans Haug (1900–1967), composer
 1904–1917: Émile-Robert Blanchet (1877–1943), pianist
 1973–1990: Ayla Erduran (tr) (born 1934)
 Current: Jorge Viladoms, pianist
 1950s: Herbert von Karajan
 2005–2010: David Bruchez, trombone
 Pierre Amoyal (born 1949), violinist
 Current: Jean-François Antonioli (born 1959), pianist, head of piano department †
 Marçal Cervera (de) (born 1928), cellist
 Guy Fallot (born 1927), cellist 
 1949: Paul Kletzki (1900–1973), conductor
 Alfred Cortot (1877–1962), conductor and pianist (taught several master classes after WWII)
 Muriel Rochat Rienth  (born 1971), recorder (teaches in Fribourg)
 André de Ribaupierre  (1893–1955), violinist
 Edmond Appia (fr) (1994–1961), violinist, conductor

HEMU alumni
 Jean-François Antonioli (born 1959), pianist (diploma and 1st Prize in 1977)
 Constantin Brăiloiu (1893–1958), composer and ethnomusicologist
 Brice Catherin (born 1981), cellist
 Caroline Charrière (1960–2018), composer, flautist
 Charles Dutoit (born 1936), conductor (studied with Herbert von Karajan in 1955)
 Guy Fallot (fr) (1927-2018), cellist (studied at the Conservatory from 1934 to 1938; earning 1st Prize in 1938) †
 Rudolph Ganz (1877-1972), composer and conductor
 Eduardo Hubert, pianist
 Fabio Maffei (fr) (born 1968), pianist and composer
 Boris Mersson (de) (1921–2013), pianist and composer
 Pat Nye (1908–1994), studied music, but became an actress
 Tedi Papavrami (born 1971), violinist (graduated 1987)
 Joseph Payne (1937–2008); organist, harpsichordist
 Louis Schwizgebel-Wang (born 1987), pianist
 Jorge Uliarte (born 1962), conductor
 Marcello Viotti (1954–2005), cellist, pianist, conductor
  (born 1925), composer, flutist, pedagog
 Julien-François Zbinden (1917-2021), pioneer jazz pianist (1938), composer

Note: † signifies alumni and faculty

Selected discography 
 Inauguration du Conservatoire de Lausanne du, VDE-Gallo 630 (CD) (1990); 
 Bach: "Erschallet, ihr Lieder, erklinget, ihr Saiten!" — 
 Perrin: "Cantosenhal" — 
 François Thury: "Mata-Hari" — 
 Alexandra Cservený: "Les animaux chanteurs de Breme" — 
 Gaudibert: "Feuillages" — 
 Lena Hauser, soprano; Stephan Imboden, bass; Miguel Fernandez, narrator; Stéphane Borel, Maxime Favrod (fr), Jacques Hostettler, percussion
 Lausanne Conservatory Chorus & Orchestra, Hervé Klopfenstein (fr), conductor
 Tracks 3 and 5 are studio recordings; 1, 2, and 4 were recorded live on 5 April 1990

Selected videos 
 HEMU promotional video
 HUMU jazz 2012 Montreux Jazz Festival

Publications 
 Chronique du Conservatoire de Lausanne et institut de musique (journal); 
 Règlement général de l'Institut de musique de Lausanne, 2nd ed. (1861); 
 25e anniversaire de fondation de l'Institut de musique de Lausanne: 1861–1886 — statistique et catalogue des élèves (1886); 
 Conservatoire de Lausanne, Institut de musique: Jubilé cinquantenaire 1861–1911 — Notice historique (1911); 
 150 Ans en Quelques Dates: Haute Ecole de Musique et Conservatoire de Lausanne

See also 
 Orchestre symphonique et universitaire de Lausanne (fr)

Notes and references

External links 

  Conservatoire de Lausanne
 Haute école de musique de Lausanne
 HEMU library
 Académie de musique de Lausanne

Music schools in Switzerland
Educational institutions established in 1861
1861 establishments in Switzerland
Education in Lausanne
Lausanne Conservatory